= Mazar, Badakhshan =

Mazar Mazār
- Location in Afghanistan
- Coordinates: 36°59′22″N 70°52′53″E
- Country: Afghanistan
- Province: Badakhshan Province
- Time zone: + 4.30

Mazar is a village in Badakhshan Province in north-eastern Afghanistan.

== See also ==
- Badakhshan Province
